Arachnis nedyma is a moth of the family Erebidae. It was described by John G. Franclemont in 1966. It is found in the US states of New Mexico and Arizona.

References

Moths described in 1966
Spilosomina
Moths of North America